Franca  or França may refer to:

People
 França (surname), a list of people with the Portuguese language surname
 Franca (given name), a list of people
 França (born 1976), Brazilian football striker Françoaldo Sena de Souza
 França (footballer, born 1991), Brazilian defensive midfielder Welington Wildy Muniz dos Santos
 França (footballer, born 1995), Brazilian forward Carlos Henrique França Freires

Places
 Franca, Brazil
 França (Bragança), Portugal

Other uses
 Franca, a genus of plants now included in Frankenia
 Franca: Chaos and Creation, a 2016 documentary film